Bipalium adensameri is a species of predatory land planarian.

References 

Geoplanidae